This is a list of games companies with office in Singapore.

A–H

 Alpha Beta Omega
 Adsumsoft
 Asiasoft Online 
 Asylum House
 Armaggeddon (Hardware)
 Battlebrew Productions
 Blizzard Entertainment (marketing)
 Boomzap Entertainment
 Booster Pack Pte. Ltd (Defunct)
 Bridged
 Cargo Studio
 Chariots Gaming
 Cherry Credits (publisher/payment provider acquired by Shanda)
 DeNA
 Daylight Studios
 Delta Duck Studios
 Electronic Arts (Marketing/Services etc.)
 Forever Young Studio (creative agency, has made games in the past)
 Finute
 Fntastic (Remote work)
 Garena
 GAMBIT Game Lab (Part of Singapore-MIT )
 Game Reign
 Gumi
 Gattai Games
 Gentle Bros
 Go Game 
 General Arcade (Porting House. HQ. RU team.)
 GToken (partially owned by Manny Pacquiao
 Happy Labs

I–R

 Infinity Core (Singapore)
 I Got Games (IGG)
 IMBA Interactive
 Interactive Digital Dreams Pte Ltd
 Inzen (invested in by Baidu)
 The Iterative Collective
 Ixora studios
 Jaysonite Studios
 Joysteak Studios
 Kaiju Den Pte Ltd (Defunct)
 L.A.I Singapore Pte Ltd (Coin-op distributor)
 LandShark Games
 Lambda Mu (games published by Chillingo)
 Lionfish Studios
 Lionstork Studios
 Lucasarts (Lucasarts Singapore now defunct)
 Magma Studios Pte Ltd
 Magic Mao
 Mercat Games
 Meta Us
 Mighty Bear Games
 Mikoishi Studios
 Namco Bandai 
 Nabi Studios (Relocated)
 MYTONA Pte Ltd.
 Nexgen Studio Pte Ltd (Advergaming)
 Nonstop games (Defunct, acquired by King (company) in 2014)
 Nubee (defunct)
 Oddity
 Outstanding Game Pte Ltd
 PD Design Studio
 Personae Studio
 Planet Arkadia Pte Ltd
 Polywick Studio
 Potato Play
 Playware Studios

S–Z

 Ratloop (Ratloop Asia)
 Razer (Hardware)
 Real U Pte Ltd (defunct)
 Reckoner Industries 
 Red Hare Studios 
 Riot Games
 Rock Nano Private Ltd 
 Rotten Mage 
 Sea, manages Garena
 Secret base 
 Secretlab
 Sony Computer Entertainment (publishing)
 Spark Jumpers
 Springloaded  (games published by Kongregate)
 Take-Two Interactive
 Teng Yun Technology Pte. Ltd.
 Tecmo Koei
 TENDAYS STUDIO
 Sweet Sweet Game 
 Think! Studio
 Ubisoft Singapore
 Unity Technologies (Engine developer)
 Vinova Pte Ltd
 Van der Veer Games
 Weike Gaming Technology (Hardware)
 Witching Hour Studios
 Ysbryd Games (Publisher. Also UK based.)
 XII Braves (games published by FunPlus)
 XYZ Wave Pte Ltd
 Zengami Pte Ltd

See also

 Lists of companies
 gamedevmap

References 

Game